Phumipat Kanthanet (born  August 3, 1997) is a Thai professional footballer who plays as a left-winger for Thai League 2 club Chainat Hornbill.

References

1997 births
Living people
Phumipat Kanthanet
Association football midfielders
Phumipat Kanthanet
Phumipat Kanthanet
Phumipat Kanthanet